Barwell is a small locality in the London Borough of Kingston upon Thames, located between Chessington and Claygate and historically in the county of Surrey. It was traditionally farmland, its name likely alluding the barley that was grown in the area.

Areas of London
Districts of the Royal Borough of Kingston upon Thames